The Drummond Professorship of Political Economy at All Souls College, Oxford has been held by a number of distinguished individuals, including three Nobel laureates. The professorship is named after and was founded by Henry Drummond.

List of Drummond Professors

Nassau Senior, 1825–1830 and 1847–52, the first holder
Richard Whately, 1830–31
William Forster Lloyd, 1832–37
Herman Merivale, 1837–
Travers Twiss, 1841–
Sir George Kettilby Rickards, 1851–1857
Charles Neate (1857–1862)
James Edwin Thorold Rogers, 1862–67 and 1888–
Bonamy Price, 1868–1888
Francis Ysidro Edgeworth, 1891–1922
David Hutchison Macgregor, 1921–1945
Sir Hubert Douglas Henderson, 1945–51
Sir John Hicks, 1952–65
R. C. O. Matthews, 1965–76
Joseph Stiglitz, 1976–1979
Amartya Sen, 1980–88
Sir John Vickers, 1991–2008 (on leave 1998–2005)
Vincent Crawford, 2010–2020

References

External links
 Oxford University Economics Department

Political Economy, Drummond
Political Economy, Drummond
All Souls College, Oxford
Lists of people associated with the University of Oxford
1825 establishments in England